Seret may refer to:

 Seret (river), a tributary of the Dniester in Ternopil Oblast, Ukraine
 Seret (Drohobych), a small tributary of the Tysmenytsia in Drohobych, Lviv Oblast, Ukraine
 Seret (Hasidic dynasty)
 Seret (Dogu'a Tembien), a place in Ethiopia

People with the surname
 Jean-Luc Seret, French chess player

See also
Siret (disambiguation)
Joseph Alfred Serret